The St. Charles Borromeo Church is a historic Catholic church building in Waltham, Massachusetts.  Built in 1922, it is a high quality example of Italian Renaissance Revival architecture, and is emblematic of the shift on Waltham's south side from a predominantly Protestant population to one of greater diversity.  The building was listed on the National Register of Historic Places in 1989.

Description and history
The St. Charles Borromeo Church is located at the southwest corner of Hall and Cushing Streets, in a residential area east of Moody Street, the main commercial artery on Waltham's south side.  It is a tall cruciform structure with no tower, built out of terra cotta brick with stone trim.  Its front facade, oriented toward Hall Street, is dominated by two colossal Corinthian columns set in a recess on either side of the main entrance, which is flanked by clustered columns and topped by a rounded arch.  A modillioned and dentillated fully pedimented gable stands above.  The interior of the nave has rows of Tuscan columns, round-arch clerestory windows, and murals on the walls.

The Roman Catholic Archdiocese of Boston decided in 1909 to establish a second parish in Waltham, and services were first held in a community hall on Moody Street later that year.  Construction of this building began in 1915, but was delayed by funding concerns, and was not restarted until 1922.  A fire gutted the interior of the nearly finished building in 1927, after which it was refurbished.  The building was designed by James F. Monaghan, a noted ecclesiastical architect.

See also
National Register of Historic Places listings in Waltham, Massachusetts

References

External links
Church web site

Churches on the National Register of Historic Places in Massachusetts
Churches in Waltham, Massachusetts
National Register of Historic Places in Waltham, Massachusetts
Charles Borromeo